William Kidston (29 April 1852 – 4 June 1929) was a Scotland international rugby union player. He could play as a half-back or three-quarters.

Rugby Union career

Amateur career

He played for West of Scotland, one of the top teams in Scotland at the time.

Provincial career

He was called up for the Glasgow District side for the world's first provincial match, the 'inter-city'  against Edinburgh District on 23 November 1872.

International career

He was called up to the Scotland squad in February 1874 and played England at The Oval on 23 February 1874.

Football career

He played for Glasgow Wanderers in 1873.

Other interests

Active in many sports including golf, curling and bowls, especially in his hometown of Helensburgh, as a founder of the golf club; a club president of the bowling club; and a member of the curling club. He was a noted businessman and philanthropist and was involved in funding the Helensburgh Town Mission. A chairman of A.G. Kidston & Co. - an iron and steel merchant firm - he later became involved in insurance and banking. The Prime Minister Bonar Law was his cousin.

He was a client of Charles Rennie Mackintosh, whom he commissioned to build the Helensburgh Conservative Club building.

References

External links
Kidston family profile
Profile of William Kidston as a client of Charles Rennie Macintosh

1852 births
1929 deaths
Scottish rugby union players
Scotland international rugby union players
Rugby union players from Glasgow
History of rugby union in Scotland
West of Scotland FC players
Glasgow District (rugby union) players
William Hamilton
Presidents of the Scottish Rugby Union